Robert Larsson (20 February 1967 – 1 February 2018) was a Swedish professional ice hockey player who played 249 games with Skellefteå AIK from 1985 to 1995. Larsson was selected by the Los Angeles Kings in the 6th round (112th overall) of the 1988 NHL Entry Draft, but he never played in North America.

Larsson died on 1 February 2018. He was the father of Seattle Kraken defenceman Adam Larsson.

References

External links

1967 births
2018 deaths
Los Angeles Kings draft picks
Skellefteå AIK players
Swedish ice hockey defencemen
People from Skellefteå Municipality
Sportspeople from Västerbotten County